The Hekatompedon or Hekatompedos (from , "hundred", and πούς, "foot"), also known as Ur-Parthenon and H–Architektur,  was an ancient Greek temple on the Acropolis of Athens built from limestone in the Archaic period, and placed in the position of the present Parthenon.

Etymology
The name of the temple was found in inscriptions and means “100 feet long” (ca. 30 m), although its length reached 46 m.

History
The temple was built around 570–550 BC. It was demolished by the Athenians in 490 BC after the victory over the Persians at the Battle of Marathon to build a larger temple known as the Older Parthenon. The latter was destroyed in 480 BC by the returning Persians in the Destruction of Athens, and finally replaced by the present Parthenon. The existence of the Hekatompedon is witnessed by historical documents. Its foundations have disappeared, but architectural and sculptural elements found in the southern part of the Mycenaean wall of Acropolis of Athens have been assigned by scholars to this temple.

Archaeology
As with many other archaeological findings on the Acropolis, the initial descriptions of Hekatompedon in the late 19th century were based only on architectural and sculptural fragments. In that context, Hekatompedon was known as H-Architektur in descriptions and cataloguing, next to other buildings such as A–, B–Architektur etc.

The description of the temple as well as its presumed location have changed since the first descriptions by Wilhelm Dörpfeld. Dörpfeld had assigned all fragments to the neighbouring Old Temple of Athena that stood between the still standing Erechtheum and Parthenon. Theodor Wiegand hypothesized in 1904 that H–Architektur was a non-peripteros temple located on the site of the Old Temple of Athena, and was in fact an earlier stage of the Old Temple that was later expanded with a peristasis. Moreover, he identified H–Architektur as the Hekatompedon mentioned in ancient inscriptions. 

However, in 1922 Ernst Buschor proposed that H–Architektur was actually located south, on the site of the still standing Parthenon and named it Ur-Parthenon, German for "original Parthenon". In 1936 Walter-Herwig Schuchhardt's extensive research on the surviving fragments and sculptures proved that the pediments of the temple must have been larger than earlier presumed. As a result, he reconstructed a peripteros temple instead of the previous reconstructions that included a distyle or tristyle in antis temple.

Further research by William Bell Dinsmoor, Immo Beyer, and others, as well as historical correlations between the surviving fragments and the destruction of the Acropolis by the Persians in 480 BC have led to the current hypothesis that Hekatompedon was a hexastyle peripteral Doric temple with a 46-metre long crepidoma and that was located on the site of Parthenon.

Pediments

One of the pediments (perhaps the West pediment) contained two lions tearing apart a bull in the centre, Herakles fights against Triton on the left and the Three-Bodied (Triple-Bodied) Daemon with the symbols of the three elements of nature in his hands on the right. The three bodies of the winged monster hold a wave, a flame and a bird and have intertwined snake tails, symbolizing the four natural elements, i.e. water, fire, air and earth, respectively. It represents either Nereus or Typhon. Overall the meaning of the whole pediment is mysterious. Some scholars believe that it means the dominance of the human wisdom over humidity: the lions are earth animals, whereas the bull represent humidity. In addition, both Triton and Nereus were sea creatures defeated by Herakles on its way to the Hesperides garden, which earned him immortality.

The East pediment, also known as the Lioness pediment, contained in the centre two symmetrically placed lions killing a calf (only one has been recovered) and two snakes on the side corners. The meaning of this scene is again unknown. The lioness has both female (breast) and male (mane) details, probably arising from the lack of knowledge of the Greek artists on these animals, which no longer populated Greece in the 6th century BC.

Other surviving sculptures include four horses and two panthers carved in relief, both from metopes of the temple, and a very fragmentary gorgon from the central akroterion.

Style

The style of the sculptures is typical of the early Archaic period. The overall narrative scenes of the pediments and metopes is half narrative, including human or semi-human figures, half animal, including animals placed in a symmetrical or repetitive fashion. This reminds of the illustrations of contemporary Greek pottery. Humans were characterized by the archaic smile. The human and animal bodies are carved with lack of confidence, compared to the sculptures of the temple of Athena Polias constructed in the Acropolis, half a century later.

See also
New Acropolis Museum
Perserschutt

References

Stamatia Eleftheratou, Acropolis Museum, guide, Acropolis Museum Editions, Athens 2014
The Hekatompedon  at the website of the Acropolis Museum ; Retrieved 19 November 2014
Hekatompedos, the archaic Parthenon at the website of the Acropolis Museum

External links
Greek thesaurus; the Hekatompedon temple

5th-century BC religious buildings and structures
Acropolis of Athens
Acropolis Museum
Ancient Greek buildings and structures in Athens
Temples in ancient Athens